Sergiy Grechyn (born 9 June 1979) is a Ukrainian road cyclist, who last rode for Ukrainian amateur team TCOP–Mykolayv.

Major results

2008
 3rd Overall Tour of Bulgaria
 6th Grand Prix of Moscow
 10th Memorial Oleg Dyachenko
2009
 1st Stage 1 (TTT) Univest Grand Prix
 8th Grand Prix of Donetsk
2010
 3rd Tour of Taihu Lake
2011
 3rd Overall Tour de Ribas
1st Stage 1
2012
 5th Road race, National Road Championships
2013
 1st  Overall Tour d'Azerbaïdjan
1st Stage 2
 1st  Mountains classification Tour of Turkey
 1st  Mountains classification Baltic Chain Tour
 1st Stage 2 Tour d'Algérie
 3rd Race Horizon Park II
 4th Road race, National Road Championships
 5th Race Horizon Park I
 8th Grand Prix of Donetsk
2014
 1st  Mountains classification Tour of Hainan
2015
 Les Challenges de la Marche Verte
5th GP Sakia El Hamra
7th GP Al Massira
8th GP Oued Eddahab
 6th Overall International Tour of Torku Mevlana
 8th Overall Tour of Mersin
 10th Odessa Grand Prix 2
2017
 4th Tour de Ribas
 Race Horizon Park
5th Race for Peace
7th Classic
7th Maidan
 8th Odessa Grand Prix

References

External links

1979 births
Living people
Ukrainian male cyclists
Sportspeople from Kyiv